Purisimeño was one of the Chumashan languages traditionally spoken along the coastal areas of Southern California near Lompoc. It was also spoken at the La Purisima Mission.

A vocabulary of "La Purrissima or Kagimuswas (Purismeno Chumash)" was collected by Henry Wetherbee Henshaw in 1884. John P. Harrington also documented the language, and wrote a sketch of the grammar.

Dr. Timothy Henry of the Western Institute for Endangered Language Documentation (WIELD) created a dictionary of the language.

Writing system

References

External links 
Wieldoc.org: Purisimeño Project at the Western Institute for Endangered Language Documentation
Purisimeño language — overview at the Survey of California and Other Indian Languages.
Language-archives.org: OLAC resources in and about the Purisimeño language

Chumashan languages
Indigenous languages of California
Extinct languages of North America
Languages extinct in the 20th century
History of Santa Barbara County, California
Lompoc, California